Natural Tunnel State Park is a Virginia state park, centered on the Natural Tunnel, a massive naturally formed cave that is so large it is used as a railroad tunnel. It is located in the Appalachian Mountains near Duffield in Scott County, Virginia.

A small river, which is now called Stock Creek, was diverted underground and it continued to erode the tunnel over many millennia.

The walls of the tunnel show evidence of prehistoric life. Many fossils have been found in the creek bed and in the tunnel walls.

Geology
The tunnel passes through Purchase Ridge, which is made of the Ordovician Chepultepec Limestone and is near the axis of the Purchase Ridge syncline. It lies between the Clinchport Thrust Fault and the Hunter Valley Thrust Fault, on the Hunter Valley Thrust Sheet. The tunnel itself began its formation in the Pleistocene period.

History

A popular legend tells of a Cherokee maiden and a Shawnee warrior who had been forbidden to marry by their respective tribes, jumped to their deaths from the highest pinnacle above the Natural Tunnel. The place is now known as Lover's Leap.

Although Natural Tunnel State Park was created in 1967 and opened to the public in 1971, the Natural Tunnel has been a Virginian tourist attraction for more than a century; Daniel Boone is reputed to have been the first European to see it in the 18th century. The 41st United States Secretary of State William Jennings Bryan dubbed it the "Eighth Wonder of the World".

The South Atlantic and Ohio railroad constructed tracks through the Natural Tunnel in 1893, and the first train passed through the following year. In 1899, the Natural Tunnel was purchased by the Tennessee & Carolina Iron and Steel Company. The railway originally carried passenger trains; today, the line is still open but now operated by Norfolk Southern, also used under trackage rights by CSX, and is only used to transport coal.

Park facilities
There is a  boardwalk that allows disabled visitors to gain access to the tunnel. 
 
Park visitors can also camp, swim, picnic and hike.

Natural Tunnel State Park Trails

References

External links

Natural Tunnel, VA State Parks website
Railroad (external)
Railroad (interna)

State parks of Virginia
State parks of the Appalachians
Parks in Scott County, Virginia
Railroad tunnels in Virginia
Protected areas established in 1967
1967 establishments in Virginia
Caves of Virginia